OpenOffice Basic (formerly known as StarOffice Basic or StarBasic or OOoBasic) is a dialect of the programming language BASIC that originated with the StarOffice office suite and spread through OpenOffice.org and derivatives such as Apache OpenOffice and LibreOffice (where it is known as LibreOffice Basic). The language is a domain-specific programming language which specifically serves the OpenOffice application suite.

Example 
Although OpenOffice Basic is similar to other dialects of BASIC, such as Microsoft's Visual Basic for Applications (VBA), the application programming interface (API) is very different, as the example below of a macro illustrates. While there is a much easier way to obtain the "paragraph count" document property, the example shows the fundamental methods for accessing each paragraph in a text document, sequentially.

Sub ParaCount
'
' Count number of paragraphs in a text document
'
    Dim Doc As Object, Enum As Object, TextEl As Object, Count As Long
    Doc = ThisComponent
' Is this a text document?
    If Not Doc.SupportsService("com.sun.star.text.TextDocument") Then
        MsgBox "This macro must be run from a text document", 64, "Error"
        Exit Sub
    End If
    Count = 0
' Examine each component - paragraph or table?
    Enum = Doc.Text.CreateEnumeration
    While Enum.HasMoreElements
        TextEl = Enum.NextElement
' Is the component a paragraph?
        If TextEl.SupportsService("com.sun.star.text.Paragraph") Then
            Count = Count + 1
        End If
    Wend
'Display result
    MsgBox Count, 0, "Paragraph Count"
End Sub

See also 
 Comparison of office suites

Further reading

External links 
 OpenOffice.org BASIC Programming Guide wiki
 LibreOffice Basic Help
 Automating Open Office in VB.NET

Articles with example BASIC code
BASIC programming language family
Basic
Basic